Mohana Sundaram is a 1951 Indian Tamil-language crime thriller film written and directed by A. T. Krishnaswamy. An adaptation of J. R. Rangaraju's detective novel of the same name, the film stars T. R. Mahalingam and S. Varalakshmi. It was released on 21 July 1951, and became an average success.

Plot

Cast 

Male
 T. R. Mahalingam as Bhoopathi
 B. R. Panthulu as Sundara Mudaliar
 K. Sarangapani as Subbanna
 V. K. Ramasamy as Mohana Mudaliar
 T. K. Ramachandran as Seetharaman
 V. K. Karthikeyan as Gopalasami
 K. Sayeeram as Bhima Rao
 K. S. Hariharan as Balu Mudaliar
 K. Natarajan as Detective Govindan
 N. Thiruvenkatam as Sub Inspector
 C. V. V. Panthulu as Ramadas
 Chandra Babu as Gopu
 Kottapuli Jayaraman as Constable
 Muthu Ramalingam, Bhairavan, Mani, Govindan,and Master Subramanyam.

Female
 S. Varalakshmi as Visalakshi (Pappa)
 V. Susheela as Leelavathi
 S. K. Venu Bai as Jagathambal
 S. R. Lakshmi as Singaram
 G. Sakunthala as Maragatham
 Saraswathi as Leelavathi's Mother
 K. S. Angamuthu as Lakshmi
 Krishnaveni, Rajeswari, Gnanakumari,Saraswathi, Prabha, and Meera.
Dance
 Kumari Kamala

Soundtrack 
The soundtrack was composed by T. G. Lingappa and the lyrics were written by K. D. Santhanam. The westernised song "Hello My Dear Darling", which contained many English words, attracted considerable attention.

References

External links 

1950s crime thriller films
1950s Tamil-language films
1951 films
Fictional portrayals of the Tamil Nadu Police
Films about organised crime in India
Films based on Indian novels
Films scored by T. G. Lingappa
Indian black-and-white films
Indian crime thriller films